James A. Baldwin (May 26, 1886 – August 2, 1964) was an American football player, track athlete, coach of football, basketball, and baseball, and college athletics administrator. A native of Somerville, Massachusetts, Baldwin played on the football, baseball, and track teams at Dartmouth College, from which he graduated in 1908. 

Baldwin served as the head football coach at Rhode Island State College—now the University of Rhode Island, the University of Maine, Trinity College in Durham, North Carolina—now Duke University, Lehigh University, and Wake Forest University, compiling a career college football record of 43–37–16. Baldwin was also the head basketball coach at the same five schools, amassing a career college basketball mark of 85–66. In addition, he served as the head baseball coach at Rhode Island State and at Lehigh, tallying a career college baseball record of 32–25–1. From 1916 to 1919, Baldwin was the athletic director at Rhode Island State while he coached three sports.

Death
Baldwin died on August 2, 1964, at a nursing home in Hyannis, Massachusetts.

Head coaching record

College football

College basketball

References

External links
 

1886 births
1964 deaths
American football halfbacks
American men's basketball coaches
American women's basketball coaches
Dartmouth Big Green baseball players
Dartmouth Big Green football players
Dartmouth Big Green men's track and field athletes
Duke Blue Devils football coaches
Duke Blue Devils men's basketball coaches
Lehigh Mountain Hawks baseball coaches
Lehigh Mountain Hawks football coaches
Lehigh Mountain Hawks men's basketball coaches
Maine Black Bears athletic directors
Maine Black Bears football coaches
Maine Black Bears men's basketball coaches
Maine Black Bears women's basketball coaches
Rhode Island Rams athletic directors
Rhode Island Rams football coaches
Rhode Island Rams men's basketball coaches
Wake Forest Demon Deacons football coaches
Wake Forest Demon Deacons men's basketball coaches
College men's basketball head coaches in the United States
High school basketball coaches in Massachusetts
High school football coaches in Massachusetts
High school football coaches in New Jersey
Sportspeople from Somerville, Massachusetts
Sportspeople from Manchester, New Hampshire
Coaches of American football from Massachusetts
Players of American football from Massachusetts
Baseball coaches from Massachusetts
Baseball players from Massachusetts
Basketball coaches from Massachusetts
Track and field athletes from Massachusetts